Rechter Thomas  is a 1953 Dutch film directed by Walter Smith in black and white. The plot is based on the book Rechter Thomas by Francois Pauwels.  The film drew circa 244,000 visitors.

Cast
Piet Bron	... 	Rechter Thomas
Ton van Duinhoven	... 	Joop
Johan Valk	... 	Inbreker
Rini van Slingelandt	... 	Lenie
Max Croiset	... 	Gevangenisbewaarder
Henri Eerens	... 	President der Rechtbank
Bob De Lange	... 	Officier van Justitie

External links 
 

1953 films
Dutch black-and-white films
Dutch crime drama films
1953 crime drama films
1950s Dutch-language films